Bharatkund railway station is one of the railway station in the Ayodhya district of Indian state of Uttar Pradesh.

It takes 20 minutes to travel from Ayodhya city to Bharatkund railway station. Travel time refers to the time taken if the distance is covered by a car.

References

Railway stations in Faizabad district
Transport in Ayodhya